Nitrianske Sučany is a village and municipality in Prievidza District in the Trenčín Region of western Slovakia.

History
In historical records the village was first mentioned in 1249.

Geography
The municipality lies at an altitude of 310 metres and covers an area of 18.067 km². It has a population of about 1260 people.

Twin towns — sister cities

Nitrianske Sučany is twinned with:
 Bohdíkov, Czech Republic

References

External links
 
 
http://www.statistics.sk/mosmis/eng/run.html

Villages and municipalities in Prievidza District